Richard George Salmon King (187123 October 1958) was the Dean of Derry from 1921 to 1946.

King was educated at Trinity College, Dublin and ordained in 1895.  He was a curate at Mullingar and then Holloway before becoming the rector of Drumachose in 1904, a post he held until his appointment to the deanery.

King was an ardent Unionist.

King was married with Dorothea King, youngest daughter of Andrew Ferguson Smyly, formerly dean of Derry, and niece of William Alexander. When King refused the offer to become Archbishop of Armagh in 1938, the illness of his wife was one of the reasons. In 1947, a stained glass window was installed in her memory in the baptistery of St Columb's Cathedral.

References

1871 births
Alumni of Trinity College Dublin
Irish Anglicans
Deans of Derry
1958 deaths